Alfredo Ramos de Oliveira (27 October 1924 in Jacareí – 31 July 2012), was a Brazilian footballer in the defense role. He was simply known as Alfredo or Polvo by fans.

In his career as player for Santos (1947–1951), São Paulo (1951–1958 and 1961) and Corinthians (1958–1960), he played 633 games, scoring 3 goals, and won one São Paulo State Championship in 1953. With the Brazilian team, he was in the first team in 10 games and was listed in the roster for the 1954 FIFA World Cup, without playing any games. In the 1970s, he was coach for the São Paulo squad (see List of São Paulo Futebol Clube managers).

Honours 
São Paulo
 Campeonato Paulista: 1953, 1957

References

1924 births
2012 deaths
People from Jacareí
Brazilian footballers
Brazilian football managers
Campeonato Brasileiro Série A players
1954 FIFA World Cup players
Campeonato Brasileiro Série A managers
Brazil international footballers
Clube Atlético Juventus players
Santos FC players
São Paulo FC players
Sport Club Corinthians Paulista players
São Paulo FC managers
Sport Club Corinthians Paulista managers
Association football defenders
Footballers from São Paulo (state)